The 20th Annual Black Reel Awards ceremony, presented by the Foundation for the Augmentation of African-Americans in Film (FAAAF) and honoring the best films of 2019, took place on February 6, 2020. During the ceremony, FAAAF presented the Black Reel Awards in 23 categories. The nominations were announced on December 11, 2019.

Queen & Slim earned a leading fourteen nominations, followed by Us and Dolemite Is My Name with eleven and ten nominations, respectively.

The 4th Annual Black Reel Awards for Television was presented on August 6, 2020. The nominations were announced on June 18, 2020. HBO's Watchmen & Insecure lead the nominees with 10 each. Watchmen became the biggest winner, earning 5 BRATs including Outstanding TV Movie or Limited Series and Outstanding Actress, TV Movie/Limited Series for Regina King. Insecure took home the top Comedy prize for Outstanding Comedy Series for a second consecutive year while Pose won the award for Outstanding Drama Series for its second season.

Film winners and nominees

Films with multiple nominations and wins

Television winners and nominees

Comedy

Drama

Television Movies/Limited Series

Programs with multiple nominations and wins

References

Black Reel Awards
2019 film awards
2019 in American cinema
2019 awards in the United States
2019 in American television
2019 television awards